Oleh Mykhaylovych Matvyeyev (born 18 August 1970) is a Ukrainian former footballer.

Career 
One of the most successful strikers at the start of the Ukrainian Premier League. In 1997, he won the title of the League top scorer with 21 tallies. Together with Serhiy Atelkin they were the best tandem nationwide. Under the Soviet Union, Matvyeyev and Atelkin played in the Soviet Union U-16 football team. He is a staff member of FC Shakhtar Donetsk.

Personal life 
His son Kyrylo is also a professional football player.

Career statistics

Club

References
  Posted on the Shakhtar's desk of honor as the League top scorer

External links
 
 

Living people
1970 births
Sportspeople from Rostov-on-Don
Soviet footballers
Ukrainian footballers
Association football forwards
FC Rostov players
FC Dynamo Kyiv players
FC Kremin Kremenchuk players
FC Shakhtar Donetsk players
FC Shakhtar-2 Donetsk players
FC Metalurh Donetsk players
FC Metalurh-2 Donetsk players
FC Metalurh Zaporizhzhia players
FC Metalurh-2 Zaporizhzhia players
Soviet Top League players
Soviet First League players
Ukrainian Premier League players
Ukrainian First League players
Ukrainian Second League players
Ukrainian football managers
Ukrainian Premier League top scorers
FC Shakhtar Donetsk non-playing staff